Fitzpatrick is an Irish surname that most commonly arose as an anglicised version of the Irish patronymic surname Mac Giolla Phádraig "Son of the Devotee of (St.) Patrick".

In some cases, it may also have independently arisen by a similar anglicization of a likely-distinct Irish patronymic, Ó Maol Phádraig, "Descendent of the Follower of (St.) Patrick", or in rare cases as a genuine Anglo-Irish patronymic incorporating the Norman French fiz ('son of') and the male name Patrick.

Giolla Phádraig (meaning "the devotee of [Saint] Patrick", also one of origins of the surname Kilpatrick) was the personal name of Gilla Patráic mac Donnchada, a tenth-century king of Ossory. His sons were subsequently styled Mac Giolla Phádraig (meaning, son of Giolla Phádraig), and gave rise to a dynasty of Kings of Ossory that bore this patronymic as a dynastic name. In the 16th century, as part of the process of king Henry VIII's surrender and regrant scheme to anglicize the Irish nobility, some members of the clan were legally obligated to render their surname as Fitz-Patrick or Fitzpatrick as part of the agreed terms with the Crown. The Fitzpatrick surname may have also been adopted later amongst other unrelated Irish families, such as the Maguires of Fermanagh.  Like the related Kilpatrick and Mulpatrick, the surname was sometimes shortened to Patrick.  

The 1901 census of Ireland indicated the top five counties for the surname Fitzpatrick, by birth, were County Cavan, followed by counties Laois, Dublin, Down and Cork. Since 2019, the Fitzpatrick Clan Society has facilitated the registration of five Fitzpatrick clans with Clans of Ireland: the Mac Gilpatrick of Ulster – Mac Giolla Phádraig Ulaidh; the Fitzpatrick / O'Mulpatrick of Breifne – Ó Maol Phádraig Breifne; the Fitzpatrick / Mac Gilpatrick of the tribe of Cas – Mac Giolla Phádraig Dál gCais; the Fitzpatrick / Mac Gilpatrick of Leinster – Mac Giolla Phádraig Laighean; and, the Fitzpatrick of Upper Ossory.

Notable Fitzpatricks

Albert Fitzpatrick (born 1928), American journalist, editor, and media executive 
Alfred Fitzpatrick (1862–1936), Canadian founder of Frontier College
Amy Fitzpatrick (born 1992), Irish girl who disappeared in 2008 in Málaga, Spain
Anna Fitzpatrick (born 1989), British tennis player
Art Fitzpatrick (1919–2015), American art director
Austin Choi-Fitzpatrick, American political sociologist
Becca Fitzpatrick (born 1979), American author
Ben Fitzpatrick (born 1994), American soccer player
Benjamin Fitzpatrick (1802–1869), American politician
Billy Fitzpatrick (born 1954), Irish hurler
Blake Fitzpatrick (born 1955), Canadian photographer
Brad Fitzpatrick (born 1980), American programmer
Brian Fitzpatrick (disambiguation), several people
Catherine A. Fitzpatrick, American author and translator 
Cathryn Fitzpatrick (born 1964), Australian cricketer
Charles Fitzpatrick (1853–1942), Canadian lawyer and politician
Colette Fitzpatrick (born 1974), Irish news anchor
Colleen Fitzpatrick (disambiguation), several people
Columbus Fitzpatrick (1810–1877), Irish-Australian builder, political activist and amateur historian
Damien Fitzpatrick (born 1989), Australian rugby player
Daniel R. Fitzpatrick (1891–1969), American editorial cartoonist
Daphne Fitzpatrick (born 1964), American artist
David Fitzpatrick (disambiguation), several people
Dawn Fitzpatrick, American investment and financial officer
De Burgh Fitzpatrick Persse (1840–1921), Australian politician
Declan Fitzpatrick (born 1983), Irish rugby union player
Dennis Fitzpatrick (1764–1806), Irish jockey
Dennis Fitzpatrick (civil servant) (1837–1920), Dublin-born Lieutenant-Governor of Punjab
Denny Fitzpatrick, American basketball player
Dermot Fitzpatrick (born 1940), Irish politician 
Desmond Fitzpatrick (1912–2002), British Army officer
Dez Fitzpatrick (born 1997), American football player
D. J. Fitzpatrick (born 1982), American football player
Dara Fitzpatrick (1972/3–2017), Irish helicopter pilot
Duross Fitzpatrick (1934–2008), American judge
Earl A. Fitzpatrick (1904–1984), American lawyer and politician 
Ed Fitzpatrick (1889–1965), American baseball player
Edward Fitzpatrick (1884–1960), American college administrator and author
Edward Fitzpatrick (died 1696), English army officer
Enda Fitzpatrick (athlete), Irish athlete married to Róisín Smyth
F. Emmett Fitzpatrick (1930–2014), American politician, attorney and professor
Fiona Fitzpatrick, one half of the Swedish music duo Rebecca & Fiona
Francis Fitzpatrick (disambiguation), several people
Frank Fitzpatrick (born 1961), American entrepreneur and composer
Frank Fitzpatrick (footballer) (born 1931), Australian rules footballer
Frank Fitzpatrick (mayor), 15th mayor of Ansonia, Connecticut, US
Gabrielle Fitzpatrick (born 1967), Australian film and television actress
Gary Fitzpatrick (born 1971), English footballer
Gary Fitzpatrick (Australian footballer) (born 1955), Australian rules footballer
George F. Fitzpatrick (1875–1920), Trinidadian barrister
Glen Fitzpatrick (born 1981), Irish footballer and manager
Graham Fitzpatrick, Scottish film director and screenwriter
Grant Fitzpatrick (born 1976), Australian Paralympic swimmer
Grant Fitzpatrick (musician), Australian musician
Harold Fitzpatrick (born 1880), English footballer
Harry Morton Fitzpatrick (1886–1949), American mycologist
Hugh Fitzpatrick (1872–1925), Australian rules footballer
Huntley Fitzpatrick, American author
Ian Fitzpatrick (born 1980), English footballer
Ian Fitzpatrick (rugby union) (born 1995), Irish rugby union player
Jack Fitzpatrick (footballer) (born 1991), Australian rules footballer
Jack Fitzpatrick (businessman) (1923–2011), American businessman and politician
Jack Fitzpatrick (cricketer) (1911–1999), Australian cricketer
James Fitzpatrick (disambiguation), several people
Jim Fitzpatrick (disambiguation), several people
John Fitzpatrick (disambiguation), several people
Jordan Fitzpatrick (born 1988), English footballer
Joseph Fitzpatrick (disambiguation), several people
Joyce Ann Fitzpatrick (born 1942), American politician
J. R. Fitzpatrick (born 1988), Canadian NASCAR Driver
J. R. Fitzpatrick (American football), American football coach in 1907
Justin Fitzpatrick (born 1973), Irish rugby union player and coach
Karl Fitzpatrick (born 1980), English rugby player
Kate Fitzpatrick (born 1947), Australian actress
Kathleen Fitzpatrick (disambiguation), several people
Keene Fitzpatrick (1864–1944), American athletic coach and trainer
Kellyanne Fitzpatrick (born 1967), birth name of Kellyanne Conway, American pollster, political consultant, and pundit
Ken Fitzpatrick (born 1963), Canadian swimmer
Kevin Fitzpatrick (disambiguation), several people
Larry Fitzpatrick (born 1976), American football player
Lee Fitzpatrick (born 1978), English footballer
Leo Fitzpatrick (born 1977), American actor
Leslie Fitzpatrick (born 1978), Trinidadian soccer player
Lynton Fitzpatrick (born 1967), Australian rules footballer
Madison Fitzpatrick (born 1996), Australian field hockey player
Marc Fitzpatrick (born 1986), Scottish footballer
Margaret Fitzpatrick (1911–1980), American actress and television producer known as Gail Patrick
Maria Fitzpatrick (born 1949), Canadian politician
Marie-Louise Fitzpatrick (born 1962), Irish children's author and illustrator
Mark Fitzpatrick (born 1968), Canadian ice hockey goalie
Mary Fitzpatrick (born 1969), Irish politician
Mary Fitzpatrick (photographer) (born 1968), English photographer 
Matt Fitzpatrick (born 1994), English golfer
Menna Fitzpatrick (born 1998), British alpine skier
Michael Fitzpatrick (disambiguation), several people
Minkah Fitzpatrick (born 1996), American football player
Morgan Cassius Fitzpatrick (1868–1908), American politician 
Noel Fitzpatrick (born 1967), Irish veterinary surgeon
Paul Fitzpatrick (born 1965), English footballer
Paula Fitzpatrick (born 1985), Irish rugby union player
Pete Fitzpatrick (died 1946), Canadian soccer player
Peter Fitzpatrick (born 1962), Irish politician and sportsperson
Peter Fitzpatrick (footballer) (born 1959), Australian rules footballer
Richard Fitzpatrick (disambiguation), several people
Richie Fitzpatrick (1880–1904), American gangster
Ron Fitzpatrick (born 1940), Australian rules footballer
Rory Fitzpatrick (born 1975), American ice hockey player
Ross Fitzpatrick (born 1933), Canadian politician
Ross Fitzpatrick (ice hockey) (born 1960), Canadian ice hockey player
Ryan Fitzpatrick (born 1982), American football player
Sandy Fitzpatrick (born 1944), American ice hockey player
Savannah Fitzpatrick (born 1995), Australian field hockey player
Seamus Davey-Fitzpatrick (born 1998), American actor
Seán FitzPatrick (born 1948), Irish banker
Sean Fitzpatrick (born 1963), New Zealand rugby union player
Sheila Fitzpatrick (born 1941), Australian historian
Shirley Fitzpatrick-Wong (born 1971), Canadian international lawn bowler
Sonya Fitzpatrick, British broadcast personality and pet psychic
Stephen Fitzpatrick, British businessman, founder of OVO Energy
Steve Fitzpatrick (born 1978), American politician
Sulu Tone-Fitzpatrick (born 1992), New Zealand netball and rugby sevens player
Theresa Fitzpatrick (born 1995), New Zealand rugby union player
Thomas Fitzpatrick (disambiguation), several people
Timmy Fitzpatrick, Irish hurler
Tony Fitzpatrick (disambiguation), several people
Toarlyn Fitzpatrick (born 1989), American basketball player 
Trevor Fitzpatrick (born 1980), Anglo-Irish footballer
William Fitzpatrick (disambiguation), several people

Middle name 
Christopher Fitzpatrick Calloway (born 1968), American football player
Paul Fitzpatrick Russell (born 1959), American Roman Catholic archbishop and diplomat
Redmond Morris, 4th Baron Killanin (born 1947), Irish film producer

See also
Fitzpatrick (disambiguation)
Brian Mac Giolla Phádraig (poet)
Kingdom of Osraige
Upper Ossory
Mulpatrick
Dál Birn

Notes

External links

The Fitzpatrick Clan Society
Fitzpatrick DNA Study
The Fitzpatrick – Mac Giolla Phádraig Clan Society

English-language surnames
Norman-language surnames
FitzPatrick dynasty
Surnames of Irish origin
Anglicised Irish-language surnames
Irish royal families
Kings of Osraige
Patronymic surnames
Surnames from given names